The Bridge Shopping Centre is a small shopping centre located in Portsmouth, England. The centre was opened in May 1989 on land which was formerly home to Portsea Island Central Premises Co-Op.

Shops
Over the years, shops have come and gone in the centre. Throughout a decade period from 2010 until 2019, a majority of the shops in the centre were empty, not being until 2020 when the Centre would gain a majority of tenants again.

Outside
 AfricExpress (Access inside the centre)
 Italian Furniture Outlet (Access inside the centre)
 Player Reality Virtual Reality (formerly My VR)
 RSPCA Charity Store
 Subway
 Wessex Community Bank (formerly Hampshire Credit Union, United Savings and Loans and Portsmouth Savers)

Inside
 Zingers Adventure Golf
 Asda Opticians
 Alan the Barber
 The Bridge Cafe
 GetBrewing.uk
 Goulds Jewellers
 Iceland
 Max Spielmann Photo Shop and Timpson
 Post Office
 Savers
 Tilly's Furniture

Former Shops
 Age UK (Formally Age Concern)
 Barnardos
 Clinton Cards
 The Co-Operative Travel (Formally Travelcare)
 Cubano Beach Club
 Ethel Austin
 Heritage Butchers
 Laser Cuts
 New Look
 Olan Mills
 Outside Centre Sports
 Pam Purred Pets (Doors inside of centre)
 Penfolds Confectionary
 Rebecca's Pantry
 Rita's Hair and Beauty
 The Scene
 Superdrug
 Shoefayre
 Select Fashion

References

Shopping centres in Hampshire
Buildings and structures in Portsmouth
Tourist attractions in Portsmouth